The Ghanchi-Pinjara  are a Muslim community found in the state of Gujarat in India. A small number of Ghanchi are also found in the city of Karachi in Pakistan.

Origin 

The Ghanchi-Pinjara evolved as a community, when a section of the Pinjara caste gave up their occupation of cotton carding and took up oil pressing. They have no connection with the Ghanchi community. The community are found mainly in the districts of Junagadh, Amreli, Rajkot, Surendranagar, and Bhavanagar. They speak Kathiawari dialect of Gujarati.

Clan divisions and occupations 

The Ghanchi Pinjara are divided into a number of clans, the main ones being the Kagatla, Varaya, Bavalia, Mavod, Salod, Kakani, Bhadra, Katia, Gujarati, Sorathia and Godhrawala. All these clans intermarry, and are of equal status. Like other Gujarati Muslims, they have their own caste association, the Pinjara Mansoori Jamat. The Ghanchi Pinjara have abandoned their traditional occupation, and most are now small farmers. A small number of Ghanchi Pinjara are now petty traders.

See also
 Muslim Ghanchi

References 

Social groups of Gujarat
Muslim communities of India
Muslim communities of Gujarat
Social groups of Sindh